The  Annie Award for Outstanding Achievement for Writing in a Feature Production (or Annie Award for Outstanding Achievement for Writing in an Animated Feature Production) is an Annie Award awarded annually, except in 1997, to the best animated feature film and introduced in 1996. It rewards screenwriting for animated feature films.

Awards for Best Writing were awarded in 1994 and 1995, but were also rewarding animated series. The award was formerly called Best Individual Achievement: Writing in 1996, and Outstanding Individual Achievement for Writing in an Animated Feature Production from 1998 to 2002,.

Winners and nominees

1990s
 Best Individual Achievement for Story Contribution in the Field of Animation

 Outstanding Individual Achievement for Writing in an Animated Feature Production

2000s

2010s

2020s

Multiple wins and nominations 
The following nominees have earned at least two wins:

Multiple Wins 
3 wins
 Brad Bird  
 Pete Docter  
 Andrew Stanton  

2 wins
 Rita Hsiao
 Phil Johnston  
 Phil Lord  
 Hayao Miyazaki  
 Chris Sanders

References

External links 
 Annie Awards: Legacy

Annie Awards
Screenwriting awards for film